André Filipe Silva Rocha Vieira (born 13 September 1992) is a Portuguese professional footballer who plays as a midfielder for Saigon FC.

Football career
Born in Faro in the Algarve, Vieira began his career with several lower-level clubs in his native region. In 2016, after a year with CD Operário in the Azores, he joined his hometown's S.C. Farense in the third tier. He was part of the team that won promotion as runners-up in 2017–18, scoring three times in the 4–1 aggregate playoff semi-final win over U.D. Vilafranquense in May.

On 21 July 2018, Vieira made his professional debut in a 2018–19 Taça da Liga first round match against Penafiel; he was substituted before the team won on penalties after a goalless draw. He scored three times in his first professional league season, including two on 14 April 2019 in a 3–1 home win over G.D. Estoril Praia having come on as a substitute with four minutes left.

In August 2019, Vieira had successful surgery to cure an oncological problem. Having played just 13 games in all competitions, scoring once, as Farense won promotion to the Primeira Liga in 2019–20, he remained in the second tier with Varzim S.C. when he signed a contract of undisclosed length on 29 June 2020.

References

External links

1992 births
Living people
People from Faro, Portugal
Portuguese footballers
Association football midfielders
Liga Portugal 2 players
Segunda Divisão players
Louletano D.C. players
S.C. Farense players
Varzim S.C. players
Sportspeople from Faro District